KAKK (1570 AM, "Fox Sports 1570/93.7") is a radio station licensed to serve Walker, Minnesota, United States.  The station is owned by De La Hunt Broadcasting and the broadcast license is held by Edward de la Hunt.  The KAKK transmitter and tower are south of Walker, near the station's original home, when it was known as KLLR.

KAKK broadcasts a sports format, including programming from Fox Sports Radio. It also carries the simulcast of the "Coffee Talk" program, which originates at KPRM, and is currently simulcasted on KDKK.

The station was assigned the KAKK call sign by the Federal Communications Commission on January 3, 2002.

On May 11, 2022, KAKK changed their format from classic hits to sports, with programming from Fox Sports Radio.

Previous logo
 (KAKK's logo under former oldies format)

References

External links
KK Radio Network official website

Radio stations in Minnesota
Sports radio stations in the United States
Cass County, Minnesota
Radio stations established in 1970
1970 establishments in Minnesota
Fox Sports Radio stations